Uniramodes is a monotypic moth genus of the family Noctuidae. Its only species, Uniramodes unicolor, is found in Tanzania. Both the genus and species were first described by Emilio Berio in 1976.

References

Acronictinae
Monotypic moth genera